(Latin: communication of properties) is a Christological concept about the interaction of deity and humanity in the person of Jesus Christ. It maintains that in view of the unity of Christ's person, his human and divine attributes and experiences might properly be referred to his other nature so that the theologian may speak of "the suffering of God".

The germ of the idea is first found in Ignatius of Antioch but the development of an adequate, agreed technical vocabulary only took place in the fifth century with the First Council of Ephesus in 431 and the Council of Chalcedon twenty years later and the approval of the doctrine of the hypostatic union of the two distinct natures of Christ. In the sixteenth century, the Reformed and Lutheran churches disagreed on this question.

The philosopher J. G. Hamann argued that the  applies not just to Christ, but should be generalised to cover all human action: "This  of divine and human  is a fundamental law and the master-key of all our knowledge and of the whole visible economy."

Developments in the Patristic period

Ignatius of Antioch emphasised both the oneness of Christ and the reality of his twofold mode of existence: "There is one physician, composed of flesh and spirit, generate and ingenerate, God in man, authentic life from death, from Mary and from God, first passible then impassible, Jesus Christ our Lord", but he uses phrases like 'the blood of God', 'the suffering of my God' and 'God ... was conceived by Mary'; Tertullian stated that the saviour was composed of two 'substances' and the human substance was in every respect genuine. He was the first theologian to tackle the question of the relationship between them; each preserved its particular qualities but Christians observe "a twofold condition, not confused but conjoined, Jesus, in one Person at once God and man".

When the question as to how deity and humanity could be combined in the Saviour was investigated in depth, two schools of thought emerged: one associated with Alexandria and the other with Antioch. Alexandrian thought drew heavily on Platonism and was markedly dualist, while its biblical exegesis was mystical and allegorical. Its Christology has been labelled the Word-flesh model. It took no real account of a human soul in Christ, but viewed the incarnation as the union of the Word with human flesh, thus drawing on the Platonic concept of the human being as a soul which inhabited an essentially alien body. Antiochene thought was based far more on Aristotelian principles and its biblical exegesis tended to be literal and historical thus taking the genuine humanity of the Saviour very seriously. The traditional label for this second type of Christology is Word-man: the Word united himself with a complete humanity, i.e. soul plus body, which did justice to the genuinely human being described in the Gospels. The Antiochene-style Christology stresses the distinction of natures and therefore a more tightly regulated communication of properties; while the Alexandrian-type Christology underscores the unity of Jesus Christ and therefore a more complete communication of properties.

Lutheran–Reformed debate

In Reformed doctrine, the divine nature and the human nature are united strictly in the person of Christ. According to his humanity, Jesus Christ remains in heaven as the bodily high priest, even while in his divine nature he is omnipresent. This coincides with the Calvinistic view of the Lord's Supper, the belief that Christ is truly present at the meal, though not substantially and particularly joined to the elements (pneumatic presence). Lutherans, on the other hand, describe a union in which the divine and the human natures share their predicates more fully. Therefore, in the eucharist the human, bodily presence of Jesus Christ is "in, within, under" the elements (sacramental union).

Notes

References 

Christology
Latin religious words and phrases